Jimmy K. Omura (born September 8, 1940 in San Jose, California) is an electrical engineer and information theorist.

Omura received his B.S. and M.S. from MIT, and his Ph.D. from Stanford University, all in electrical engineering. He was a professor of electrical engineering at UCLA for 15 years. His notable work includes the design of a number of spread spectrum communications systems, and the Massey-Omura cryptosystem (with James Massey). With Andrew Viterbi he co-authored  Principles of Digital Communication and Coding, a standard textbook in digital communications. He also co-authored the Spread Spectrum Communications Handbook.

Omura founded the data security company Cylink, which had an IPO in 1996 and was acquired by SafeNet in 2003. He was the technology strategist for the Gordon and Betty Moore Foundation during 2002 - 2011.

In 2005, Omura received the IEEE Alexander Graham Bell Medal. He was elected a member of the National Academy of Engineering in 1997 for contributions in spread-spectrum communications and data encryption. He was inducted into the Silicon Valley Engineering Hall of Fame in 2009.

External links
 Biography at the Moore Foundation
 Biography at IEEE History Center
 Biography at USC Viterbi School of Engineering

Living people
American information theorists
American electrical engineers
MIT School of Engineering alumni
Stanford University School of Engineering alumni
1940 births
Members of the United States National Academy of Engineering